Crime and Punishment is a 2002 American-Russian-Polish drama film written and directed by Menahem Golan and starring Crispin Glover and Vanessa Redgrave. It is an adaptation of Fyodor Dostoyevsky's 1866 novel of the same name. The film was filmed in 1993 but not released until 2002.

Plot
Though the story of Crime and Punishment was written and set in the 19th century, this film version takes place in the then-future setting of the late 20th century. Rodion Raskolnikov, a student in his twenties who lives in Moscow, has published a paper in which he argues that certain superior individuals can legitimately ignore laws, even those against murder. He acts out this arrogant theory by murdering an old woman, who is a pawnbroker, and her sister, who accidentally witnesses the crime. In the aftermath, Raskolnikov is increasingly tortured by his conscience.

Cast
 Crispin Glover as Rodion Romanovich Raskolnikov
 Vanessa Redgrave as Rodion's mother
 John Hurt as Porfiry, chief investigator
 Margot Kidder as Mrs. Katerina Marmeladova
 John Neville as Marmeladov, Sonia's alcoholic father
 Sophie Ward as Dunia, Rodion's sister
 Patricia Hayes as Alyona Ivanovna, old pawnbroker
 Theodore Bikel as Captain Koch
 Clive Revill as Zamyotov
 Matt Servitto as Razumikhin, Rodion's friend
 Avital Dicker as Sonia Marmeladova, prostitute
 Ron Perlman as Dusharo

Release
The release of the film had been restricted by legal matters that left it seized in a bankruptcy lien.
It was eventually released in the UK on DVD by Prism Leisure Corporation.

References

External links
 

2002 films
English-language Russian films
Russian independent films
2002 drama films
American drama films
Films based on Crime and Punishment
Films shot in Moscow
Films shot in Russia
Films set in the 2000s
Films directed by Menahem Golan
Films scored by Robert O. Ragland
American independent films
Polish independent films
Films produced by Menahem Golan
Films with screenplays by Menahem Golan
2000s English-language films
2000s American films